Dimitar Atanasov may refer to:
 Dimitar Atanasov (canoeist)
 Dimitar Atanasov (footballer)